Shanna McCullough (born April 1, 1960) is an American pornographic actress.

Early life 
McCullough grew up in San Francisco, California. At school, she was involved with the theater group, and acted in drama and musicals. She went to college and received a degree in accounting. Then she worked as an electrician for two years, and also as a veterinary technician.

Career 

Shanna McCullough chose her stage name Shanna after the heroine from her favorite romance novel, and McCullough because of her Irish ancestry.

After starting to work in porn, she also performed as a dancer in nightclubs. During a break from the business, she also worked as a stripper and went back to school to study zoology, with the aim of working in the animal health care field. In 1999, wired.com reported that Shanna was operating a website called ShannaCam giving members 24-hour access to multiple webcams installed in her home. As of March 2009, the website appears to have ceased operating. In March 2008, she walked the Los Angeles Marathon. Dave Cummings has said Shanna was one of the actresses he most enjoyed working with.

In a 2014 interview with The Rialto Report, McCullough said she picked her stage name as it sounded like her grandmother's last name. She also professed to have had a fairly "normal upbringing" and that she did well in school. In the interview, she clarified how her name "McCullough" is pronounced ("-lough" should be articulated "-low" rather "-off"). She is of English, French, German, Irish, and Swiss descent.

Awards 

 1988 AVN Award – Best Actress—Video (Hands Off)
 1997 AVN Award – Best Supporting Actress—Film (Bobby Sox)
 1999 AVN Award – Best Actress—Film (Looker)
 2000 AVN Award – Best Supporting Actress—Video (Double Feature)
 AVN Hall of Fame
 XRCO Hall of Fame
 Lifetime Achievement Award – Free Speech Coalition, July 2000

References

External links 

 
 
 

1960 births
Actresses from San Francisco
American female adult models
American pornographic film actresses
Living people
Pornographic film actors from California
21st-century American women